Timane Erdimi is the leader of the Chadian rebel group Rally of Democratic Forces (Rassemblement des Forces pour le Changement, RFC) which had 800 soldiers in early 2008. He is a member of the ethnic group Zaghawa and nephew of the Chadian President Idriss Déby.

Biography 
An international arrest warrant was issued by Chad for Erdimi in 2007. He was among 12 people sentenced to death in absentia by a Chadian court on August 15, 2008. Responding to this sentence, Erdimi said that he had been unaware of the trial and remarked that it was his opponents in the government who "should be put on trial".

Despite past differences, various rebel groups, including the RFC, agreed to unite as the Union of Resistance Forces on January 19, 2009. Erdimi said that this move would "allow us to better fight against the regime", and he spoke scornfully of the improvements Déby had made to his military, saying that Déby "should have bought robots for his new tanks and planes" because "he won't find anyone to drive and fly them when we attack." The Union of Resistance Forces reportedly chose Erdimi by consensus to lead the new group on January 23.

By 2017, Erdimi was living in exile in Qatar; from there, he was still commanding a loyal rebel force which was based in southern Libya. His continued activities resulted in Chad severing diplomatic relations with Qatar, arguing that the later state was supporting "terrorism".

References

Chadian rebels
Living people
People sentenced to death in absentia
Zaghawa people
Year of birth missing (living people)